The 1922–23 Hamilton Tigers season was the third season of the NHL franchise in Hamilton. For the third consecutive season, the Tigers finished last in the standings.

Offseason

Regular season

Final standings

Record vs. opponents

Schedule and results

Playoffs
The Tigers didn't qualify for the playoffs

Player statistics

Note: Pos = Position; GP = Games played; G = Goals; A = Assists; Pts = Points; PIM = Penalty minutes      MIN = Minutes played; W = Wins; L = Losses; T = Ties; GA = Goals-against; GAA = Goals-against average; SO = Shutouts;

Awards and records

Transactions

See also
1922–23 NHL season

References

Bibliography

 
 

Hamilton Tigers (ice hockey) seasons
Hamilton Tigers
Hamilton